The Phoenix and the Carpet is a BBC Television adaption of the 1904 book of the same name by E. Nesbit about four children in Edwardian England who acquire a phoenix and the adventures they have as a result.

The six-part serial was first broadcast in 1997 and starred David Suchet as the Phoenix.

Production
The series was a co-production between the BBC and HIT Entertainment and took the format of six 28-minute episodes, first broadcast on BBC One between November and December 1997.

The Phoenix and the Carpet is part of a family of BBC productions about the adventures of the Bastable children, based on novels by E. Nesbit, launched in 1991 with Five Children and It in six episodes, followed in 1993 by The Return of the Psammead. All three were adapted by Helen Cresswell, and apart from the children the Psammead, created and voiced by Francis Wright, appears in all three.

The serial was first released on DVD in a truncated version, only half as long as the original, but a full version was issued in February 2015.

Outline
In the first episode, a second-hand carpet is delivered to the Bastable household in London. Impatient for the arrival of Guy Fawkes Night, the four Bastable children had set off fireworks in the nursery, leading to a fire. Rolled up in the carpet, the children find a large egg. When they accidentally knock it into the fire, it hatches, and a talking Phoenix emerges. The new carpet is a magic carpet and can take the children anywhere, and with it they have some exotic adventures.

The Phoenix is a friend of the Psammead, whom the children already know, and his help is sometimes called upon.

In the sixth episode, the Phoenix decides it is time for him to begin his cycle again, going up in flames to arise from the ashes in two thousand years’ time. He lays an egg, and immolates himself.

Cast
David Suchet as the Phoenix 
Francis Wright as the Psammead 
Jessica Fox as Anthea Bastable 
Ben Simpson as Cyril Bastable
Charlotte Chinn as Jane Bastable
Ivan Berry as Robert Bastable 
Miriam Margolyes as Cook
Lesley Dunlop as Eliza 
Christopher Biggins as Tonks
Shaun Dingwall as Burglar 
Gemma Jones as Mrs Bibble
Jean Alexander as Lily 
Kim Vithana as Oriental Princess 
Zina Badran as a Lady 
Miranda Pleasence as Miss Peasmarsh
Nicola Redmond as Amelia 
Ian Keith as Father 
Mary Waterhouse as Mother

Home Media
A VHS and DVD release from Reader's Digest (under license from BBC Worldwide) were released, containing the entirety of the serial.

Notes

External links
 The Phoenix and the Carpet at bbc.co.uk
  
Playlist of the production on YouTube

1990s British drama television series
Television series set in the 1900s
1997 British television series debuts
1997 British television series endings
Television shows based on British novels
Television shows set in London
BBC television dramas
Television series by Mattel Creations
Television series by Miramax Television
English-language television shows